Xū Gǔ (Hsü Ku, traditional: 虛谷, simplified: 虚谷); (c. 1824–1896) was a Chinese painter and poet during the Qing Dynasty (1644–1912).

Early life and career 
Xu was born in She County in the Anhui province, and later lived in Guangling in the Jiangsu province. His style name was 'Xugu' and his sobriquet was 'Ziyang Shanren'. Xu was an army official, and then later a monk. When painting he used the side of the brush in a fluent and bold style. In poetry he produced the work Poetry of Xugu monk.

References

External links 

 Xu Gu - Walking on Snow in Search of Plum Blossoms

1820s births
1896 deaths
Year of birth uncertain
Painters from Anhui
Qing dynasty painters
People from Huangshan
Qing dynasty Buddhists
Qing dynasty poets
Poets from Anhui
19th-century Chinese poets
19th-century painters
19th-century Chinese people
19th-century Chinese painters
Buddhist artists